Painan is a coastal town that serves as the capital of the South Pesisir regency of West Sumatra, Indonesia. It is an urban centre (kelurahan) in IV Jurai District.

History
There is no certain historical document or archive that holds the origin of the town's name. According to the local folklore, the name 'Painan' is originated from paik nian, which means "very bitter" in bahasa Minangkabau, the language of the Minangkabau people who lives in the area. The phrase paik nian itself might refer to how difficult the life of the town's local people in the past. It is might also reflect the fact that the town's topography (surrounded by hills and rivers) caused this place to be difficult to traverse by travelers.

This coastal town became an important place during Indonesia's colonial period since 1663 when the Dutch, via the Dutch East India Company set-up a trading post in Pulau Cingkuk (Cingkuk Island), one of many islands that are located offshore the town, as documented in the "Perjanjian Painan" or 'Painan Treaty'. Through the treaty, the local chiefs of West Coast of Sumatra were also bound themselves to supply pepper and gold to the Dutch.

Economy
Nowadays, as the capital of South Pesisir regency, this town is the center of economic activities in the regency. According to the regency's website, this town's main economic activities lies on farming, fishery, and tourism.

Education
Painan has 4 Kindergartens and 2 Play Groups.
It also has 9 Primary schools, 2 Junior High schools, 1 Senior High school, 1 Public High school and 1 University.

Administration
Painan is divided into 3 administrative villages or kelurahan :
 East Painan
 Painan
 South Painan

Climate
Painan has a tropical rainforest climate (Af) with heavy to very heavy rainfall year-round.

Tourism

These are several tourist attractions in Painan :

 Paragliding from the town's Langkisau Hill
 Panorama of the Kabung Bay Hills .
 Taratak River in Lundang
 Mandeh Tourism Area
 Batu Kalang Beach and the Gulf Coast Sikulo
 Jembatan akar or "Tree-Root Bridge", a bridge that forms from the fabric of the root from two trees that grow across and extends over a stream
 Bayang Sani Waterfalls (also known as Welkum, a former Dutch era bathhouse)
 Lumpo Waterfall
 Langkisau Hill (sights and paragliding)
 Carocok Beach
 Timbulun Waterfall
 Salido Kecil (a famous gold mine during the era of Dutch East Indies)
 Nipah River shore
 Cingkuk Island (Site of the ruin of a Portuguese-Dutch fort)
 Kerabak Island
 Turtle Island
 Teluk Kasai Beach

Notes

External links
 http://int-mark.blogspot.com/2009/03/kota-painan-kota-rang-pasisia.html
 http://kotapainan.blogspot.com/2008/12/kota-painan.html
 https://web.archive.org/web/20101223161630/http://www.pesisirselatan.go.id/
 http://wawasanislam.wordpress.com/2008/05/29/salido-sejak-kerjaan-lumbung-ameh/

Populated places in West Sumatra
Regency seats of West Sumatra